Xavier Espot Zamora (born 30 October 1979) is an Andorran judge and politician. He is a former minister of justice and the current prime minister of Andorra since 16 May 2019.

Under the government of Antoni Martí, between 25 July 2012 and 28 February 2019 he was the minister of social affairs, justice and interior, succeeding Rosa Ferrer Obiols. 
He resigned on 29 February 2019 as Minister to prepare his candidacy for the prime minister in the 2019 general election.

Zamora has a degree and a master's degree in Law from the Faculty of the Superior School of Business Administration and Management (ESADE). In addition, he also has a degree in Humanities from the Faculty of Philosophy of the Ramon Llull University of Barcelona.

See also
Executive Council of Andorra

References 

1979 births
Democrats for Andorra politicians
Heads of Government of Andorra
Living people
Members of the General Council (Andorra)
Government ministers of Andorra
People from Escaldes-Engordany